La Réunion was a utopian socialist community formed in 1855 by French, Belgian, and Swiss colonists on the south bank of the Trinity River in central Dallas County, Texas (US). The colony site is a short distance north of Interstate 30 near downtown Dallas. The founder of the community, Victor Prosper Considerant, was a French democratic socialist who directed an international movement based on Fourierism, a set of economic, political, and social beliefs advocated by French philosopher François Marie Charles Fourier. Fourierism subsequently became known as a form of utopian socialism.

Initially, plans for the colony were loosely structured as Considerant intended to make it a "communal experiment administered by a system of direct democracy." The crux of the plan was to allow participants to share in profits derived from capital investments and the amount and quality of labor performed. La Réunion existed for only eighteen months with its demise attributable to financial insolvency, a shortage of skilled participants, inclement weather, inability to succeed at farming, and rising costs.

History
The founders of La Réunion intended it to become a socialist utopian colony; they were inspired by the writings of the French philosopher Charles Fourier, who advocated communal production and distribution for communal profit. Unlike other early communist systems, both men and women could vote and individuals could own private property.

Founding
La Réunion was founded in Texas by Victor Prosper Considerant, a member of the Fourier movement in Lyon, France. He had been forced into exile after staging protests against Napoléon III's military expedition to Rome. After personally inspecting an area near the three forks of the Trinity River in Texas, he returned to Europe where he formed a group of future settlers.

Land purchase
Advance agent François Cantagrel was sent ahead to buy  at $700 per acre to establish the location of the colony. As the land was not good for farming, the property was a poor choice for the intended colony, although most of the would-be colonists were not farmers. Approximately 200 colonists arrived by ship near present-day Houston. They walked overland to the site of their new colony approximately  northward, with their possessions hauled by ox carts, and arrived on April 22, 1855.

Original population
The general area surrounding the three forks of the Trinity River had about 400 inhabitants at the time. The addition of the French colonists nearly doubled the population. The new arrivals spoke a different language from the settlers, believed in a different system of government and Catholic faith, and brought with them skills that the existing farmers did not possess. The watchmaking, weaving, brewing and storekeeping skills of the new colonists were ill-suited to the establishment of a colony, since they lacked the experience and ability to produce food for themselves.

Texas weather
Although the colonists cultivated wheat and vegetables, they did not produce enough for their needs or in time; their biggest handicap was the uncooperative weather of Texas. A blizzard in May 1856 destroyed the colony's crops and covered the Trinity River with ice. That summer the Texas heat created drought conditions, and what was left of the crops became eaten by an invasion of grasshoppers.

Decline
Although more than 350 European colonists eventually made La Réunion their home, the experiment was already beginning to fail as the population began to leave due to the community's financial troubles. Some returned to Europe while others moved out of the area. 

On January 28, 1857, Allyre Bureau, one of the society leaders, gave formal notice of the colony's dissolution. By 1860, what most of the remaining land was incorporated into the expanding city of Dallas. The last La Réunion house collapsed in the 1930s. By 1940, the city of Dallas incorporated the remaining unoccupied land that was once La Réunion.

Legacy
Shortly before the demise of La Réunion, botanist and pharmacist Jacob Boll arrived and taught Julien Reverchon. The latter man became celebrated in his own right as a professor of botany at Baylor University College of Medicine and Pharmacy in Dallas. The first brewery and butcher shops in Dallas were established by former colonists from La Réunion; Maxime Guillot opened a carriage factory that operated for 50 years.

Eventually what had been cultivated as farmland at La Réunion was discovered to be covering large deposits of limestone; it was gradually quarried and transported to build the growing state of Texas.

The cemetery on the old colony site still serves as the final resting place for some of the colonists. It is maintained by the City of Dallas and is located in west Dallas. The La Réunion Cemetery received a historic marker in 1974. The Daughters of the American Revolution placed a small memorial to the colony at a nearby golf course. The La Réunion Dallas historical site received a historic marker on April 10, 1924.

The Reunion District and Reunion Tower were named after the colony and are located a few miles east of where La Réunion once existed.

See also 
Christian communism
Victor Prosper Considerant
Charles Fourier
Jean-Baptiste-André Godin
Icarians, a French utopian movement which attempted to set up a colony in Denton County in 1848.
Trinity River
Utopian socialism

References

Santerre, George H. White Cliffs of Dallas. The Book Craft, Dallas, 1955. Dallas Public Library Reference: R.976.428 S234W.  The Story of La Reunion, the Old French Colony.
Considerant, Victor. Au Texas. New York, 1855. Dallas Public Library Reference: REF R334.683 C755A 1975. In French.

External links
Dallas newspaper articles related to La Reunion
Brief history of early communism in Texas, Fortune City
"La Reunion", Texas, Ghost Towns
"La Reunion Arts Residency program", (est. 2006, Dallas, Texas)
"La Reunion", Santerre and Cretien Families Collection at the Dallas Public Library
"La Reunion, a French Settlement in Texas by William J. Hammond, Ph.D.  and  Margaret F. Hammond", 1958.  Royal Publishing Company: Dallas, Texas. Public domain  ebook by Project Gutenberg.
Location on present-day map

1855 establishments in Texas
Belgian-American history
Fourierism
French-American culture in Texas
Ghost towns in North Texas
History of Dallas
Politically motivated migrations
Populated places established in 1855
Socialism in the United States
Swiss-American culture in Texas
Utopian communities in the United States